Midshipman Easy is a 1915 British silent adventure film directed by Maurice Elvey and starring Elisabeth Risdon, Fred Groves and A. V. Bramble. It was based on the 1836  novel Mr Midshipman Easy by Frederick Marryat which was made into a sound film Midshipman Easy by Carol Reed in 1935.

Cast
 Elisabeth Risdon - Don's Daughter
 Fred Groves - Don Sylvio
 A. V. Bramble - Mesty
 Compton Coutts - Easy

References

External links

1915 films
British historical adventure films
British silent short films
1910s historical adventure films
1910s English-language films
Films directed by Maurice Elvey
Films based on British novels
Films based on works by Frederick Marryat
Films set in the 18th century
Films set in the 1790s
Films set in England
Films set in Italy
Seafaring films
British black-and-white films
Films set on ships
Napoleonic Wars films
1910s British films
Silent historical adventure films